The 1890 Ontario general election was the seventh general election held in the Province of Ontario, Canada. It was held on June 5, 1890, to elect the 91 members of the 7th Legislative Assembly of Ontario ("MLAs").

The Assembly had been increased from 90 members after the passage of an Act in 1889 creating Nipissing as a riding.

The election was a victory for the Ontario Liberal Party, led by Oliver Mowat. The party won a sixth consecutive term in government, despite losing a small number of seats in the Legislature.

The Ontario Conservative Party, led by William Ralph Meredith won two additional seats.

This election was held partially using the Limited voting system where each Toronto voter had two votes for the three MPPs in the district. This produced mixed representation in that district and thus a degree of minority representation.

A key issue in the election was the segregation of schools for Catholic and Protestant students, with the Liberal Party supporting the segregation and the Conservatives opposing it.

Results

|-
! colspan=2 rowspan=2 | Political party
! rowspan=2 | Party leader
! colspan=5 | MPPs
! colspan=3 | Votes
|-
! Candidates
!1886
!Dissol.
!1890
!±
!#
!%
! ± (pp)

|style="text-align:left;"|Oliver Mowat
|87
|57
|
|53
|4
|162,118
|49.63%
|1.22

|style="text-align:left;"|William Ralph Meredith
|74
|32
|
|34
|2
|130,289
|39.88%
|7.14

|style="text-align:left;"|Conservative-Equal Rights
|style="text-align:left;"|
|14
|–
|–
|2
|2
|26,154
|8.01%
|

|style="text-align:left;"|Liberal-Equal Rights 
|style="text-align:left;"|
|2
|–
|–
|2
|2
|3,352
|1.03%
|

|style="text-align:left;"|
|1
|1
|–
|–
|1
|7
|–
|0.68

|style="text-align:left;"|
|7
|–
|–
|–
|
|3,131
|0.96%
|

|style="text-align:left;"|
|1
|–
|–
|–
|
|1,620
|0.50%
|

|style="text-align:left;"|
|
|–
|–
|–
|
|colspan="3"|Did not campaign

|style="text-align:left;"|
|
|–
|–
|–
|
|colspan="3"|Did not campaign

|colspan="3"|
|
|colspan="5"|
|-style="background:#E9E9E9;"
|colspan="3" style="text-align:left;"|Total
|186
|90
|90
|91
|
|326,671
|100.00%
|
|-
|colspan="8" style="text-align:left;"|Blank and invalid ballots
|align="right"|3,110
|style="background:#E9E9E9;" colspan="2"|
|-style="background:#E9E9E9;"
|colspan="8" style="text-align:left;"|Registered voters / turnout
|473,853
|69.60%
|0.09
|}

Seats that changed hands
In its first election, Nipissing returned the Liberal candidate John Loughrin as its MLA.

In the election, 20 seats changed their allegiance.

Liberal to Conservative
Algoma East
Dundas
Elgin East
Essex North
Hamilton
Lincoln
Ontario North
Renfrew North
Simcoe East
Welland

Liberal to Liberal-Equal Rights
Lanark North

Conservative to Liberal
Grey North
Grey South
Hastings West
Norfolk South
Perth North

Conservative to Conservative-Equal Rights
Dufferin
Durham East

Conservative to Liberal-Equal Rights
Victoria West

Independent to Liberal
Parry Sound

See also
Politics of Ontario
List of Ontario political parties
Premier of Ontario
Leader of the Opposition (Ontario)

References

1890
1890 elections in Canada
1890 in Ontario
June 1890 events